KFLO-FM (89.1 FM, "Miracle 89.1") is a radio station licensed to serve Blanchard, Louisiana.  The station is owned by the Family Life Educational Foundation. It airs a Christian Contemporary music format.

The station was assigned the KFLO-FM call letters by the Federal Communications Commission on March 31, 2006.
Miracle 89.1 is simulcast on KKML (90.9 FM) in Minden. The station's HD2 subchannel broadcasts religious talk as "The Promise, Family Life Talk", which is rebroadcast by a translator at 90.7 FM in Shreveport.

References

External links
KFLO-FM official website
Promise Talk Radio website

Contemporary Christian radio stations in the United States
Caddo Parish, Louisiana
Radio stations established in 2006
Christian radio stations in Louisiana